{{DISPLAYTITLE:C17H13ClN4}}
The molecular formula C17H13ClN4 (molar mass: 308.76 g/mol, exact mass: 308.0829 u) may refer to:

 Alprazolam
 Liarozole

Molecular formulas